Ute Noack (born 27 December 1961) is a former East German cross-country skier who competed during the 1980s.

Noack was born in Annaberg-Buchholz, Bezirk Karl-Marx-Stadt.  She won a bronze medal in the 4 × 5 km relay at the 1985 FIS Nordic World Ski Championships in Seefeld and also finished 11th in the 20 km event at those same championships.

Noack's best finish at the Winter Olympics was eight in the 5 km event at Sarajevo in 1984. Her best individual career finish was fourth twice in 1985.

Cross-country skiing results
All results are sourced from the International Ski Federation (FIS).

Olympic Games

World Championships
 1 medal – (1 bronze)

World Cup

Season standings

Team podiums

 2 podiums

Note:   Until the 1999 World Championships, World Championship races were included in the World Cup scoring system.

References

External links

Women's 4 x 5 km cross-country relay Olympic results: 1976-2002 
World Championship results 

1961 births
Living people
People from Annaberg-Buchholz
People from Bezirk Karl-Marx-Stadt
German female cross-country skiers
Sportspeople from Saxony
Cross-country skiers at the 1984 Winter Olympics
FIS Nordic World Ski Championships medalists in cross-country skiing
20th-century German women